is a Japanese amateur boxer who won a gold medal in the inaugural women's featherweight event at the 2020 Summer Olympics. She became the first Japanese woman to win an Olympic gold medal in boxing.

Biography
Irie was born in Yonago, Japan in 2000. She took up boxing when she was seven years old at a local gym. Irie was inspired to box from the sports manga television series Ganbare Genki, which features a character who wants to become a boxer. She also took her inspiration from frogs.

At the 2020 Summer Olympics in Tokyo, Irie beat Karriss Artingstall of Great Britain in the semi-finals of the women's featherweight, and then went on to beat Nesthy Petecio of the Philippines in the final to win the gold medal. At the time of winning her gold medal, Irie was a university student at Nippon Sport Science University. Irie later stated that she would retire from boxing after graduating, with plans to work for a company making video games.

In September 2022, she announced that she would retire from boxing after her graduation in spring 2023.

References

External links
 

2000 births
Living people
Japanese women boxers
Olympic boxers of Japan
Boxers at the 2020 Summer Olympics
Sportspeople from Tottori Prefecture
Olympic medalists in boxing
Olympic gold medalists for Japan
Medalists at the 2020 Summer Olympics